Nikola Storm (born 30 September 1994) is a Belgian professional footballer who plays for Mechelen as a winger.

Career
Storm made his professional debut in the Belgian Pro League for Club Brugge against KV Mechelen in a 3–0 home win replacing Maxime Lestienne after 75 minutes on 7 December 2013.

He scored the first goal as Mechelen defeated Gent 2–1 in the 2019 Belgian Cup Final.

Career statistics

Honours
Club Brugge
 Belgian Super Cup: 2016

Mechelen
 Belgian Cup: 2018–19

References

External links
 
 

1994 births
Living people
People from Maldegem
Belgian footballers
Footballers from East Flanders
Association football midfielders
Association football forwards
Belgium youth international footballers
Belgian Pro League players
Challenger Pro League players
Club Brugge KV players
S.V. Zulte Waregem players
Oud-Heverlee Leuven players
K.V. Mechelen players